Fatty and Mabel at the San Diego Exposition is a 1915 American silent black-and-white short comedy film, directed by  Fatty Arbuckle and starring Arbuckle and Mabel Normand. It was produced by Keystone Studios.

Plot
Fatty (Roscoe Arbuckle) and Mabel (Mabel Normand) are a married couple visiting the Exposition. Fatty gets in trouble by flirting with a passing woman (Minta Durfee) while Mabel shops. He chases the woman into a hula pavilion and makes approaches to the dancers. He is accosted by both Mabel and the woman's husband; eventually the police are called to straighten the whole thing out.

Cast
 Roscoe 'Fatty' Arbuckle as Fatty
 Mabel Normand as Mabel
 Minta Durfee
 Harry Gribbon as Man in audience at hula show
 Frank Hayes
 Edgar Kennedy as Cop
 Joe Bordeaux as Flirty guy in go-cart

Production background
Arbuckle and Normand followed the Keystone tradition of showing up at an actual event and using that as background for a largely improvised film. The event in this case was the Panama-California Exposition, held in Balboa Park in San Diego, California in 1915–1916. The film is 14 minutes long. It was released on January 23, 1915.

See also
 Fatty Arbuckle filmography
 Mabel and Fatty Viewing the World's Fair at San Francisco (1915)

References

External links
 
 
 Fatty and Mabel at the San Diego Exposition available for free download at Internet Archive

1915 films
1915 comedy films
1915 short films
Silent American comedy films
American silent short films
American black-and-white films
Balboa Park (San Diego)
Films directed by Roscoe Arbuckle
Films produced by Mack Sennett
Films shot in San Diego
Films set in San Diego
Keystone Studios films
World's fairs in fiction
1910s American films
1910s English-language films